The Uinta Highline Trail is a trail in the Uinta Mountains of Utah that traverses the range  from east to west. The trail passes through expansive alpine landscapes dominated by metasedimentary rocks sculpted by past glaciers. The broad glacial basins are dotted by hundreds of lakes.

Route

The Uinta Highline Trail extends  along the east-west oriented crest of the Uinta Mountains. The eastern terminus is at McKee Draw along U.S. Route 191, between Flaming Gorge Reservoir and Vernal. The western terminus is at Hayden Pass near Mirror Lake on Utah Route 150;. The trail crosses eight named passes that exceed  elevation and many other smaller saddles and ridges. Between these high points, the trail drops into broad, glacially carved basins and valleys.

The Uinta Highline Trail passes through a mosaic of forests, subalpine meadows, alpine tundra, and rock and snow fields, but the striking character of the trail is its openness and expansive views—treeless terrain accounts for over half the distance of the trail.

The trail is designated as Trail 025 for the  it passes through the Ashley National Forest and Trail 083 for the  it passes through the Wasatch-Cache National Forest, with Rocky Sea Pass being the dividing line. Over half the route is located in the High Uintas Wilderness where travel is limited to those on foot and horseback.

Hiking

The Uinta Highline Trail can be hiked in either direction, but hikers of its entire 104-mile length more often hike east to west. The trail starts at the Highline Trailhead in McKee Draw, just 0.5 miles west of U.S. Highway 191 on Forest Road 062. A vault toilet and parking area are at the trailhead. The first  of trail pass through forest and subalpine meadows, and there can be limited sources of water, particularly late in the season. There, Hacking Lake is a short hike off the trail.

From Leidy Peak westward, the trail crosses long stretches of alpine tundra, rocky passes, and subalpine forests. Numerous lakes and streams serve as water sources.
  
The trail ends at the Highline Trailhead at Hayden Pass on the Mirror Lake Scenic Byway (Utah Route 150). A vault toilet and parking area are located at the trailhead. This is a busy trailhead, particularly on summer weekends, and is within a federal fee area requiring a day pass (may be purchased at a couple locations along the Mirror Lake Scenic Byway) or an annual America the Beautiful Pass.

The Uinta Highline Trail passes two additional trailheads. Both are many miles from paved highways and are reached by gravel roads. The Leidy Peak trailhead is at mile 24. The Chepeta Lake trailhead is at mile 38. In the past some users have chosen to shorten the distance traveled due to the unmaintained condition of the far eastern portion of the trail. However, since 2013 the trail from US Highway 191 to Leidy Peak has been improved through the efforts of volunteers from Vernal, Utah.

There is no permit required to hike the Uinta Highline Trail.

The Uinta Highline Trail has a remote, primitive character. In places, the trail lacks tread and is merely a route marked with occasional cairns, posts, or signs. This can be attractive to users who seek solitude and have the necessary navigation skills.

Gallery

See also
 Ashley National Forest
 High Uintas Wilderness
 Uinta Mountains

References

External links
Uinta Highline Trail: Quick and Dirty Guide, sectionhiker.com

Hiking trails in Utah
Long-distance trails in the United States
Features of the Uinta Mountains
Protected areas of Duchesne County, Utah
Protected areas of Uintah County, Utah
Ashley National Forest